Hollywood Harry is a 1986 film starring and directed by Robert Forster. It was Forster's first film as producer and director. The film also featured Forster's 14-year-old daughter, Kate.

Plot
A private detective who is drinking himself to death is rescued by his niece and a new client who needs help.

Production
The film was funded largely by Bran Arandjelovich. Forster did not take a fee for the film.

It was shot in 26 days in July and August 1984.

References

External links

1986 films
American detective films
American neo-noir films
Golan-Globus films
1980s English-language films
1980s American films